Caledonia Cascade, sometimes called Cascade Falls, is a  waterfall located in Rabun County, Georgia, USA near the town of Tallulah Falls. This waterfall occurs on a small stream that drops into the Tallulah Gorge near the beginning of the gorge. It is best viewed from the hiking trail around the rim of the Tallulah Gorge. After Amicalola Falls, Cascade Falls is the second tallest waterfall in Georgia (tied with Cochrans Falls).
Description of North and South Rim Trails
TopoQuest Map of Cascade Falls
World Waterfall Database entry for Caledonia Cascade

Waterfalls of Georgia (U.S. state)
Protected areas of Rabun County, Georgia
Waterfalls of Rabun County, Georgia